The Coega Wind Farm is a wind farm in Coega, an Industrial Development Zone (IDZ) covering  of land, that is situated within the Nelson Mandela Metropolitan Municipality near Port Elizabeth, in the Eastern Cape province of South Africa. Installed by the Belgian company , it was the first commercial wind farm built in the country.

References

Wind farms in South Africa
Nelson Mandela Bay Metropolitan Municipality
Economy of the Eastern Cape